Ann Scott-Moncrieff (1914–1943), author, was a daughter of Major J. D. M. Shearer. She was born in Kirkwall, Scotland, in 1914. At one time she attended the University of Edinburgh, after which, in 1934, she married George Scott-Moncrieff, a Scottish novelist and topographer.

She contributed to the making of BBC programmes and her first published literary work was a children's story, Aboard the Bulger, which appeared as a serial in "The Bulletin" before its publication in book form. Later appeared a volume of short stories, The White Drake and Other Tales. Her last book, Auntie Robbo, was published in the United States in 1940. 

Ann Scott-Moncrieff died in 1943. She was survived by her husband and three children. Her three children's books have been re-issued by Scotland Street Press.

Bibliography

 Aboard the Bulger
 The White Drake and Other Tales (1936)
 Auntie Robbo (1941)
New Editions

 Auntie Robbo (2019)

 Aboard the Bulger (2020)
 Firkin and the Grey Gangsters (2021) (original title—The White Drake and Other Tales)

References

External links

Works by Ann Scott-Moncrieff at Project Gutenberg Australia

Scottish women novelists
People from Orkney
1914 births
1943 deaths
People from Kirkwall
Alumni of the University of Edinburgh
20th-century British novelists
20th-century British women writers
Scottish children's writers